Dmitry Rak (born 21 June 1976) is a Belarusian freestyle skier. He competed at the 2002 Winter Olympics and the 2006 Winter Olympics.

References

1976 births
Living people
Belarusian male freestyle skiers
Olympic freestyle skiers of Belarus
Freestyle skiers at the 2002 Winter Olympics
Freestyle skiers at the 2006 Winter Olympics
Sportspeople from Minsk